Ellenson is a surname. Notable people with the surname include:

David Ellenson (born 1947), American rabbi and theologian
Gene Ellenson (1921–1995), American football player and coach and athletics administrator
Henry Ellenson (born 1997), American basketball player

See also
Ellefson